Aphaena submaculata is a species of planthoppers in the sub-family Aphaeninae of Fulgoridae. Species are distributed from eastern India, Indo-China, China and Malesia.

Taxonomy and discovery 
Aphaena submaculata was first described by James Duncan in 1843. In Duncan's 1843 account, he referred to the species as Aphana submaculata. In 1851, Francis Walker reclassified the species as Aphaena submaculata. In 1863, Carl Stål reclassified the species as Euphria submaculata.

Simultaneous to Duncan's discovery, Carl Stål would describe Aphana resima in 1855. In 1858, Francis Walker reclassified this species as Aphaena resima. In 1895, Carl Eduard Adolph Gerstaecker would reclassify the species again as Euphria resima. In 1906, William Distant would determine that the species was synonymous with Euphria submaculata, with this reclassification being upheld upon review by Victor Lallemand in 1963. In 1947, Robert L. Metcalf reclassified the species one final time as Aphaena (Aphaena) submaculata.

There are three recognised subspecies: Aphaena submaculata resima (Stål, 1855), Aphaena submaculata burmanica (Distant, 1906), Aphaena submaculata consanguinea (Distant, 1906). A. submaculata, alongside other members of the Fulgoridae family, are referred to colloquially as "lanternflies".

Description 
Distant, in his 1906 description, stated the head, upper thorax, and legs were a yellow-brown (ochraceous) color. The lateral margins of the pronotum are black and the abdomen is made of ochraceous and black segmental margins, with a color described as similar to pitch. The abdomen is covered by brick-red color forewings and light spots, and the taris are also a black color. The tibiae are a greenish color, the tegmina are a dull red and covered in light spots. The costal tegmina have regular, light spots, while the apical area is covered in darker spots. The underside of the tegmina are a bright red, with pale, white spots. At the wing's costal area, there are also a series of blue-black spots and the wings turn to a black color as they approach the abdomen. The anal and posterior regions have a series of scattered spots. The mesonotum has three ridges.

Subspecies

Aphaena submaculata consanguinea 
The subspecies Aphaena submaculata consanguinea differs from A. submaculata in that its tegmina lack spots, instead it has a dark red, irregular transverse fasciae which are notable narrower than  A. submaculata. The subspecies also lacks blue-black spots along its costal areas and its wings only present black coloration on the basal fourth, the anterior tibiae, and the tarsi. This subspecies is slightly smaller than A. submaculata. Distant described the subspecies as "difficult to discern, and individual judgments as to the separation of species must frequently be formed".

Aphaena submaculata burmanica 
The body and legs are an ochraceous color with the sides of the head and legs having a red color. The top of the rostrum, lateral margins of pronotum, the anterior tibiae, the top of the intermediate and posterior tibiae, and the entire tarsi are all black. The abdomen is covered with light spots, and the tegmina are a rose-red color with the margin covered in spots. The costal margin's spots are linearly designed while the outer margin is irregularly spotted. The wings are a deeper red compared to the tegmina and the tips of the wings have an ochraceous color. The tip of the anus is covered in large scattered spots. The mesonotum has a set of three ridges and the cephalic process extends from the bottom of the abdomen to the middle of the pronotum. Its size is comparable to A. submaculata.

Behavior 
A. submaculata will pierce plants with its specialized mouthparts, feeding on tree sap. A. submaculata has been observed feeding with Lycorma imperialis.

References 

Aphaeninae
Fulgoridae
Insects described in 1843
Hemiptera of Asia